José Manuel "Josesito" López (born July 19, 1984) is an American professional boxer and former world title challenger.

Professional career

NABF light welterweight championship
On January 28, 2011 López took out undefeated Mike Dallas Jr. by knockout in the seventh round, to win the North American Boxing Federation Light Welterweight Championship. The bout was televised on ESPN's Friday Night Fights.
 
López was originally scheduled to fight Kendall Holt in a defense of his title sometime in 2012, but Holt pulled out of the fight. Victor Ortiz was in need of an opponent after his scheduled opponent for June 23, 2012, Andre Berto, failed a drug test which scuttled their rematch for the interim WBC title. Lopez stepped up to face Ortiz and defeated him by technical knockout in the tenth round. During the ninth round, Lopez connected with a punch to Ortiz's jaw that broke it on impact and rendered him unable to continue. 
López is now represented by Al Haymon.

López vs. Álvarez
 
After scoring a huge upset against Ortiz, Lopez was given the opportunity to fight for the WBC junior middleweight title against Saul "Canelo" Álvarez. Lopez had just moved up from Junior Welterweight (140) to fight Ortiz and was now being asked to move up a further seven pounds, and was not given a chance by too many press row scorers, with most feeling he was out of his depth. This was unfortunately proven to be true. On September 15, 2012, the two combatants squared off in the ring, and from very early on Álvarez' size and experience began to show through, knocking Lopez down in the second, third, and fourth rounds en route to stopping him in the fifth round after referee Joe Cortez determined he was taking too much punishment.

López vs. Maidana
 
Following his stoppage loss to Álvarez, Lopez was paired up with Marcos Maidana, a former junior welterweight contender famed for his punching power and ferocity.  Maidana had just come off a win against former junior middleweight contender Jesús Soto Karass, and was looking to get back into title contention. The bout itself was fought on June 8, 2013 at the Home Depot Center. Lopez started off the bout well, countering the more powerful Maidana well. However in the sixth Lopez began to fade from his opponents power and relentlessness, and following a brutal right hand from Maidana, Lopez was dropped. Lopez made the count, but was unable to clear his head and was stopped by a brutal assault of punches, giving him his sixth professional loss.

Lopez vs. Berto
 
He appeared in the first Premier Boxing Champions on Spike TV broadcast, against Andre Berto, on March 13, 2015. The fight took place at the Citizens Bank Arena in Ontario, CA and was part of a double main event. Josesito was stopped in the 6th round after the second consecutive knockdown without being given a countdown and the stoppage is considered controversial. The referee was Raul Cantu Jr, who has received negative comments on his performance.

López vs. Muñoz cancellation
López was scheduled to face veteran journeyman 25-19-1 (16KOs) Héctor Muñoz in an 8 rounder for February 10th 2018 on the undercard of Garcia vs. Lipinets. The undercard fight was postponed along with the main event for March 10th when Lipinets suffered a hand injury. The fight with Muñoz did not happen for undisclosed reasons.

Lopez vs. Thurman 
On January 26, 2019, Lopez challenged Keith Thurman for the WBA welterweight title. Lopez was ranked at #7 by the WBA. Thurman started off the fight strong, dropping Lopez in the second round. Thurman mostly dominated the first part of the fight. Lopez, however, turned the tables in the second part of the fight, hurting and almost finish Thurman in the seventh. Lopez tried to finish the fight early but was unable to. While one of the judges had it a draw, 113-113, the two other judges saw Thurman as the clear winner, scoring the fight 117-109 and 115-111 in favor of the champion.

Lopez vs. Molina Jr. 
On 28 September, 2019, Lopez fought fellow veteran John Molina Jr. Lopez was ranked #8 by the WBC at welterweight. Lopez proved he has a lot more left in the tank, by dropping his opponent three times en route to a ninth round knockout.

Lopez vs. Santana 
In his next fight, Lopez fought Francisco Santana. Lopez ended the fight early via a tenth round TKO.

Professional boxing record

See also
List of current NABF Champions

References

External links

Josesito Lopez - Profile, News Archive & Current Rankings at Box.Live

American boxers of Mexican descent
Boxers from California
Welterweight boxers
1984 births
Living people
American male boxers
Sportspeople from Riverside, California